Hustlers Convention may refer to:

Hustlers Convention (house duo)
 Hustlers Convention (Lightnin' Rod album)
Hustlers Convention, a compilation album by Music of Life